Nethea is a genus of sponges belonging to the family Pachastrellidae.

The species of this genus are found in Southern Europe.

Species:

Nethea amygdaloides 
Nethea nana

References

Tetractinellida
Sponge genera